Philippe Louis Myre (born November 1, 1948) is a Canadian former professional ice hockey goaltender who played 14 seasons in the National Hockey League (NHL) for the Montreal Canadiens, Atlanta Flames, St. Louis Blues, Philadelphia Flyers, Colorado Rockies and Buffalo Sabres. He featured in the 1980 Stanley Cup Finals with the Flyers.

Playing career
Originally selected by the Montreal Canadiens in the 1966 NHL Entry Draft, Myre played parts of three seasons with the Canadiens. In 1970-71, because of an injury to Rogatien Vachon, he played 30 regular season games and dressed for 70. However, during the playoffs, the Canadiens went with rookie Ken Dryden. When Montreal won the Cup, Myre was included in the team picture and was given a Stanley Cup ring, but his name was left off the Cup, even though he qualified, because he did not dress for any playoff games.

He was claimed by the Atlanta Flames in the 1972 NHL Expansion Draft, where he played for almost six seasons. Although Myre began as the starting goaltender for the expansion club, he spent most of his time in Atlanta backing up Dan Bouchard. He was traded along with Curt Bennett and Barry Gibbs from the Flames to the Blues for Bob MacMillan, Dick Redmond, Yves Bélanger and a second‐round selection in the 1979 NHL Entry Draft (23rd overall–Mike Perovich) on December 12, 1977. Myre also played for the Philadelphia Flyers, Colorado Rockies, and Buffalo Sabres.

In the 1979–80 NHL season, Myre and rookie goalie Pete Peeters backstopped the Flyers through an undefeated streak of 35 games, an NHL record. Myre saw some action in the playoffs that year, including a game 3 6-2 loss in the Finals, which the Flyers lost to the New York Islanders in six games.

After his playing career ended in 1984, Myre was a goaltending coach for the Los Angeles Kings, Detroit Red Wings and Florida Panthers.

Career statistics

Regular season and playoffs

International

References

External links
 
Phil Myre's profile at Hockey Draft Central

1948 births
Living people
Atlanta Flames players
Buffalo Sabres players
Canadian ice hockey goaltenders
Chicago Blackhawks coaches
Colorado Rockies (NHL) players
Detroit Red Wings coaches
Florida Panthers coaches
Florida Panthers scouts
Fort Worth Texans players
French Quebecers
Houston Apollos players
Ice hockey people from Quebec
Los Angeles Kings coaches
Montreal Canadiens draft picks
Montreal Canadiens players
Montreal Canadiens scouts
Montreal Voyageurs players
National Hockey League first-round draft picks
Niagara Falls Flyers players
Ottawa Senators coaches
Ottawa Senators scouts
People from Sainte-Anne-de-Bellevue, Quebec
Philadelphia Flyers players
Rochester Americans players
St. Louis Blues players
Shawinigan Bruins players
Stanley Cup champions
Canadian ice hockey coaches